The 1931–32 Serie A season was the sixth season of the Serie A, the top level of ice hockey in Italy. SG Cortina won the championship by defeating Hockey Club Milano in the final.

Qualification round

Western Group
Excelsior Milano - Ambrosiano Milano 2:1
Hockey Club Milano II - Excelsior Milano 2:1

Eastern Group

Final Qualification
SG Cortina - Hockey Club Milano II 0:0 (after 3 overtimes), 7:0

Final
SG Cortina - Hockey Club Milano 2:1

External links
 Season on hockeytime.net

1931–32 in Italian ice hockey
Serie A (ice hockey) seasons
Italy